β-Glucocerebrosidase (also called acid β-glucosidase, D-glucosyl-N-acylsphingosine glucohydrolase, or GCase) is an enzyme with glucosylceramidase activity that is needed to cleave, by hydrolysis, the beta-glycosidic linkage of the chemical glucocerebroside, an intermediate in glycolipid metabolism that is abundant in cell membranes (particularly skin cells). It is localized in the lysosome, where it remains associated with the lysosomal membrane. β-Glucocerebrosidase is 497 amino acids in length and has a molecular weight of 59,700 Daltons.

Structure 
β-Glucocerebrosidase is a member of the glycoside hydrolase family 30 and consists of three distinct domains (I-III). Domain I (residues 1–27 and 383–414) forms a three-stranded anti-parallel β-sheet. This domain contains two disulfide bridges that are necessary for correct folding, as well as a glycosylated residue (Asn19) that is required for catalytic activity in vivo. Domain II (residues 30–75 and 431–497) consists of two β-sheets that  resemble an immunoglobulin fold. Domain III (residues 76–381 and 416–430) is homologous to a TIM barrel and is a highly conserved domain among glycoside hydrolases. Domain III harbors the active site, which binds the substrate glucocerebroside in close proximity to the catalytic residues E340 and E235. Domains I and III are tightly associated, while domains II and III are joined by a disordered linker.

Mechanism 
Crystal structures indicate that β-glucocerebrosidase binds the glucose moiety and adjacent O-glycosydic bond of glucocerebroside. The two aliphatic chains of glucocerebroside may remain associated with the lysosomal bilayer or interact with the activating protein Saposin C.

Consistent with other glycoside hydrolases, the mechanism of glucocerebroside hydrolysis by β-glucocerebrosidase involves acid/base catalysis by two glutamic acid residues (E340 and E235) and precedes through a two-step mechanism. In the first step, E340 performs a nucleophilic attack at the carbon of the O-glycosidic linkage to displace the sphingosine moiety, which is simultaneously protonated by E235 as it is released from the active site. In the second step, glucose is hydrolyzed from the E340 residue to regenerate the active enzyme.

Properties 
β-Glucocerebrosidase is maximally active at pH 5.5,  the pH of the lysosomal compartment. Within the lysosome, GCase remains associated with the membrane, where it binds and degrades its substrate glucocerebroside (GluCer). GCase requires the activating protein Saposin C as well as negatively charged lipids for maximal catalytic activity. The role of Saposin C is not known; however, it is shown to bind both the lysosomal membrane and the lipid moieties of GluCer, and therefore may recruit GluCer to the active site of the enzyme.

β-Glucocerebrosidase is specifically and irreversibly inhibited by the glucose analog Conduritol B epoxide.  Conduritol B epoxide binds to the GCase active site, where the enzyme cleaves its epoxide ring, forming a permanent covalent bond between the enzyme and the inhibitor.

Initially, GCase was thought to be one of the few lysosomal enzymes that does not follow the mannose-6-phosphate pathway for trafficking to the lysosome. A study in I-cell disease fibroblasts (in which the phosphotransferase that puts Mannose 6-phosphate on proteins to target them to the lysosome is defective) showed targeting of GCase to the lysosome independent of the M6P pathway.  The lysosomal transporter and integral membrane protein LIMP-2 (Lysosomal Integral Membrane Protein 2) was shown to bind GCase and facilitate transport to the lysosome, demonstrating a mechanism for M6P-independent lysosomal trafficking.  This conclusion was called into question when a crystal structure of GCase in complex with LIMP-2 showed a Mannose 6-phosphate moiety on LIMP-2, suggesting the complex can also follow the traditional mannose-6-phosphate pathway.

Clinical significance 
Mutations in the glucocerebrosidase gene cause Gaucher's disease, a lysosomal storage disease characterized by an accumulation of glucocerebrosides in macrophages that infiltrate many vital organs.

Mutations in the glucocerebrosidase gene are also associated with Parkinson's disease.

A related pseudogene is approximately 12 kb downstream of this gene on chromosome 1. Alternative splicing results in multiple transcript variants encoding the same protein.

Drugs 
Alglucerase (Ceredase) was a version of glucocerebrosidase that was harvested from human placental tissue and then modified with enzymes.  It was approved by the FDA in 1991 and has been withdrawn from the market due to the approval of similar drugs made with recombinant DNA technology instead of being harvested from tissue. Drugs made recombinantly pose no risk of diseases being transmitted from the tissue used in harvesting, and are less expensive to manufacture.

Recombinant glucocerebrosidases used as drugs include:
 Imiglucerase (Cerezyme)
 Velaglucerase (Vpriv)
 Taliglucerase alfa (Elelyso)

See also 
 Closely related enzymes
 GBA2: acid β-glucosidase (bile acid), also 
 GBA3: acid β-glucosidase (cytosolic),

References

Further reading

External links 
  GeneReviews/NCBI/UW/NIH entry on Gaucher disease
 
 

EC 3.2.1